Chaetochlorops is a genus of frit flies in the family Chloropidae. There are at least three described species in Chaetochlorops.

Species
These three species belong to the genus Chaetochlorops:
 Chaetochlorops inquilinus (Coquillett, 1898) i c g b
 Chaetochlorops scutellaris (Becker, 1916) c g
 Chaetochlorops tanyaspis Hibbert & Wheeler, 2007 c g
Data sources: i = ITIS, c = Catalogue of Life, g = GBIF, b = Bugguide.net

References

Further reading

External links

 

Oscinellinae